Jennifer Camelon  is the former interim master (president and CEO) of the Royal Canadian Mint , and currently serves as its chief financial officer and senior vice president of finance and administration. She held the position from July 2, 2018, following the resignation of Sandra Hanington, until the appointment of Marie Lemay to the role on January 21, 2019. She was the fifth woman to serve in this capacity, following Ruth Hubbard, Danielle Wetherup, Marguerite Nadeau and Hanington.

Education 
Camelon obtained a Bachelor of Commerce (Honours) from Queen's University in Kingston, Ontario. In addition, she is a Chartered Professional Accountant (CPA) (CA).

Career
Prior to her appointment as Master of the Mint, she served as the firm's chief financial officer and vice-president of finance and administration, appointed to the role in January 2015. Before joining the firm, Camelon was the chief financial officer for QNX Software Systems, a subsidiary of the BlackBerry enterprise.

References

21st-century Canadian civil servants
Royal Canadian Mint presidents
 Year of birth missing (living people)
Living people